This is a list of ministers heading the Ministry of Foreign Affairs of Egypt.

List

1933 :        Nakhla George al-Motyei Pasha
1933 :        Salib Sami Bey (1st time)
1933 - 1934 : Abdel Fattah Yahya Ibrahim Pasha (2nd time)
1934 - 1935 : Kamel Ibrahim Bey
1935 - 1936 : Aziz Ezzat Pasha
1936 :        Ali Maher Pasha (1st time)
1936 - 1937 : Wasef Boutros Ghali Pasha (4th time)
1937 - 1939 : Abdel Fattah Yahya Ibrahim Pasha (3rd time)
1939 - 1940 : Ali Maher Pasha (2nd time)
1940 :        Hassan Sabry Pasha
1940 - 1941 : Hussein Sirri Pasha (1st time)
1941 - 1942 : Salib Sami Bey (2nd time)
1942 - 1944 : Mustafa an-Nahhas Pasha
1944 - 1945 : Mahmoud an-Nukrashi Pasha (1st time)
1945 - 1946 : Abdel Hamid Badawi Pasha
1946 :        Ahmed Lutfi el-Sayed
1946 :        Ibrahim Abdel Hadi Pasha
1946 - 1947 : Mahmoud an-Nukrashi Pasha (2nd time)
1947 - 1948 : Ahmed Mohamed Khashaba Pasha (1st time)
1948 - 1949: Ibrahim Dessouqy Abaza Pasha
1949 :        Ahmed Mohamed Khashaba Pasha (2nd time)
1949 - 1950 : Hussein Sirri Pasha (2nd time)
1950 - 1952 : Muhammad Salah al-Din Bey
1952 :        Ali Maher Pasha (3rd time)
1952 :        Abdel Khaliq Hassuna (1st time)
1952 :        Hussein Sirri Pasha (3rd time)
1952 :        Abdel Khaliq Hassuna (2nd time)
1952 :        Ali Maher Pasha (4th time)
1952 :        Ahmed Mohamed Farrag Tayei
1952 - 1964 : Mahmoud Fawzi
1964 - 1972 : Mahmoud Riad
1972 :        Mohammed Murad Ghaleb
1972 - 1973 : Mohammed Hassan El-Zayyat
1973 - 1977 : Ismail Fahmi
1977 :        Boutros Boutros-Ghali (1st time) (acting)
1977 - 1978 : Muhammad Ibrahim Kamel
1978 - 1979 : Boutros Boutros-Ghali (2nd time) (acting)
1979 - 1980 : Mustafa Khalil
1980 - 1984 : Kamal Hassan Ali
1984 - 1991 : Esmat Abdel Meguid
1991 - 2001 : Amr Moussa
2001 - 2004 : Ahmed Maher
2004 - 2011: Ahmed Aboul Gheit
2011: Nabil Elaraby
2011: Mohamed Orabi
2011 - 2013: Mohamed Kamel Amr
2013 - 2014: Nabil Fahmy
2014–Present: Sameh Shoukry

See also
Cabinet of Egypt

References

 
Foreign relations of Egypt
Egypt